Simone Ferrari (born 13 May 1999) is an Italian football player who plays as a midfielder for Serie D club Chievo Sona on loan from Brescia.

Club career
He is a product of Brescia youth teams. He spent the 2018–19 season in Serie D with Adrense. On 8 July 2019 he signed his first professional contract with Brescia for a term of 5 years.

On 15 July 2019 he joined Serie C club Pergolettese on loan. He made his professional Serie C debut for Pergolettese on 25 August 2019 in a game against Como. He started the game and played the whole match.

On 25 September 2020 the loan to Pergolettese was renewed for the 2020–21 season.

For the 2021–22 season, Ferrari was loaned to Giana Erminio.

References

External links
 

1999 births
Living people
Footballers from Brescia
Italian footballers
Association football midfielders
Serie C players
Serie D players
Brescia Calcio players
U.S. Pergolettese 1932 players
A.S. Giana Erminio players